Agonopterix mikkolai is a moth in the family Depressariidae. It was described by Alexandr L. Lvovsky in 2011. It is found in Nepal.

The wingspan is about 25 mm. The forewings are pale brown with black specks at the anterior half of the wing. The basal half of the hindwings is white and the outer half is pale grey.

Etymology
The species is named are after Finnish entomologist Dr. Kauri Mikkola, the collector of the holotype.

References

Moths described in 2011
Agonopterix
Moths of Asia